Cenk Ünnü (born 1967 in Istanbul) is the drummer of the heavy metal band Mezarkabul (also known as Pentagram). He and Hakan Utangaç formed Pentagram together in 1986. He graduated from Istanbul University’s Faculty of Literature, Anthropology. He lives in Istanbul and runs an underground music store called Pena. He is married and has a son, Arda, and a daughter, Öykü.

Discography
with Pentagram

 Pentagram 1990
 Trail Blazer 1992
 Anatolia 1997
 Popçular Dışarı 1998
 Unspoken 2001
 Bir 2002

External links
 Official Mezarkabul website

1967 births
Living people
Turkish drummers
Heavy metal drummers